Lilac kingfishers are  kingfishers in the genus Cittura, found in the lowlands of the Indonesia island of Sulawesi and the neighbouring Sangihe and Talaud Islands.

Taxonomy
The genus Cittura was introduced by the German naturalist Johann Jakob Kaup in 1848. The genus name is from classical Greek kitta for "magpie" and oura for "tail". 

There are two species:

C. sanghirensis Sharpe, 1868 – Sangihe and Talaud Islands – Sangihe lilac kingfisher
C. cyanotis (Temminck, 1824) – northern Sulawesi and Lembeh Island – Sulawesi lilac kingfisher

References 

Cittura
Taxa named by Johann Jakob Kaup